The Sea Shall Not Have Them is a 1954 British war film starring Michael Redgrave, Dirk Bogarde and Anthony Steel. It was directed by Lewis Gilbert and is based on the 1953 novel by John Harris, about a North Sea rescue during the Second World War. The musical soundtrack is by composer Malcolm Arnold.

The film title is the motto of the Royal Air Force's Air Sea Rescue Service.

Plot
It is the autumn of 1944. Allied armies are sweeping through France towards Germany. A British Lockheed Hudson has been damaged in aerial combat with a German Messerschmitt, with both aircraft ditching in the North Sea, twenty miles off the Dutch coast. The four crew from the British aircraft are unable to send a complete mayday alert, although a signal fragment reaches England. Among them is Air Commodore Waltby (Michael Redgrave) who has a briefcase containing secret German plans related to rocketry. Flight Sergeant Mackay (Dirk Bogarde) assumes a leading role in the rescue dinghy, tying everyone together to prevent anyone falling overboard, and sharing his boots with the pilot despite the cold. As the weather closes in and a freezing cold night descends, aircraft suspend their search, leaving the now waterlogged dinghy to face the sea alone. Cryptically, Waltby orders the crew members that if he dies, they must get the briefcase to London or throw it overboard should they face capture.

An RAF Air Sea Rescue sea launch is deployed to the search. Commanded by Flying Officer Treherne (Anthony Steel), Launch 2561, or "Sixty One" in radio signals, struggles against the bad weather, mechanical problems and a fire in the galley. Second in command, Flight Sergeant Singsby (Nigel Patrick) dominates the crew, playing a benevolent but demanding hand with the questionable seamanship of junior ranks. On the second day, updated intelligence about the dinghy's likely location is received from the downed German Messerschmitt pilot, who the RAF has since rescued. RAF Air Sea Rescue is now aware the dinghy has drifted inshore, far from its ditching point. As the weather clears, "Sixty One" sights the dinghy and approaches for rescue, negotiating fire from enemy shore batteries and a mine field. Launch 2561 safely returns to England where the briefcase with secret documents is delivered. An injured Flying Officer Treherne and Flight Sergeant Mackay are applauded by senior officers.

Cast

Production
The film was based on a 1953 book by John Harris, which became a best seller.

In August 1953, it was announced that both Rank and ABPC were competing for the film rights, which were expected to go for $20,000.

Producer Dan Angel arranged one of the strongest male casts of the era. It was one of a number of sea-related themes made in Britain following the success of The Cruel Sea. It was one of a number of war movies Anthony Steel made in which he was supporting of an older British star.

There were six weeks filming on location in Felixstowe, followed by studio work at Riverside.

Referring to the film's title, Noël Coward said of the film's two male stars, "I don't see why not. Everyone else has." Redgrave was reportedly bisexual, while Bogarde was homosexual.

The film was shot at the Riverside Studios in Hammersmith and Felixstowe in Suffolk. Filming had finished by June 1954.

Reception
Variety said the film "has several basic ingredients of a boxoffice success; 
tough but believable plot, a cast too big for the average theatre marquee and exciting action sequences in the climax when the missing air crew is picked up within range of enemy shore batteries."

According to Kinematograph Weekly it was a "money maker" at the British box office in 1955. The film performed poorly at the US box office, like most British war movies of this era.

References

External links
 
 
 
The Sea Shall Not Have Them at Letterbox DVD

1954 films
1954 war films
British aviation films
British World War II films
Films about shot-down aviators
Films based on British novels
Films directed by Lewis Gilbert
British black-and-white films
Films scored by Malcolm Arnold
Films shot at Riverside Studios
Films shot in Suffolk
1950s English-language films
1950s British films